Gulf of Ancud is a large body of water separating the Chiloé Island from the mainland of Chile. It is located north of the Gulf of Corcovado by which it is separated by Desertores Islands. To north Calbuco Archipelago separates it from Reloncaví Sound.

External links
 Satellite map of Golfo de Ancud

Chiloé Archipelago
Bodies of water of Los Lagos Region
Ancud
Ancud